The Autumn Stone is a posthumous retrospective double album, and the second compilation album released in the UK by Small Faces in 1969 on the Immediate label.

Album profile 
The double album contains most of the Small Faces' Immediate and Decca original 7" single releases, together with live recordings from a concert at Newcastle City Hall and previously unreleased material, some of which was possibly intended for the band's projected but unrealised fourth LP, 1862.

Alongside the title track, the album contained an alternate version of "Afterglow Of Your Love" (which had been released as the Small Faces' final single earlier in the year), covers of two Tim Hardin songs ("If I Were A Carpenter" and "Red Balloon") and the instrumentals "Wide Eyed Girl On The Wall" and "Collibosher" (both of which are claimed to be unfinished backing tracks by the compilers of the Here Comes The Nice box set).

The title track "The Autumn Stone" and "Wham Bam Thank You Ma'am" (its correct title, according to composer Steve Marriott - 'Wham Bam Thank You Man, as it was titled on the Afterglow single where the song first found release in March 1969, was apparently a label misprint) had originally been recorded on 11 September 1968 as the A and B sides of a projected (but ultimately unreleased) single. This recording session proved to be the band's final studio work together aside from some session work in Paris with Peter Frampton for a Johnny Hallyday album in December.

Release
The Autumn Stone album was released by Immediate Records founder Andrew Loog Oldham in November 1969, more than six months after the band had officially announced their break up, and three months after Steve Marriott's new band Humble Pie had released their own debut LP. In Germany, a single LP version with only the 'new' material was released under the title In Memoriam. On some later repressings of the LP the live version of All Or Nothing is replaced with the 1966 studio version, and the 1969 single version of "Afterglow" is replaced with an edit of the 1968 album version from Ogden's Nut Gone Flake.

A 3LP/2CD 'definitive expanded deluxe edition' of the album, remastered from original sources and including extra material, is scheduled for release at a (so far unspecified) future date.

 Track listing 
All tracks written by Steve Marriott and Ronnie Lane unless otherwise noted. All lead vocals by Marriott, except where noted.

 Personnel 
Steve Marriott - vocals, guitar, harmonica
Ronnie Lane - vocals, guitar, bass guitar
Kenney Jones - drums
Ian McLagan - keyboards, guitar, bass guitar, vocals
Jimmy Winston - vocals, keyboards

 References/Notes Notes:References''':

 Paolo Hewitt John Hellier (2004). Steve Marriott - All Too Beautiful....  Helter Skelter Publishing  .
 Paolo Hewitt/Kenney Jones (1995) small faces the young mods' forgotten story - Acid Jazz 

 See also 
 Small Faces discography

 External links 
 [ Allmusic's album review of The Autumn Stone'']
 The Darlings of Wapping Wharf Laundrette - Biography
 Youtube: Autumn Stone
 The Official Small Faces site

Small Faces albums
1969 compilation albums
Immediate Records compilation albums